Admiral Thomas Joseph Lopez (born January 29, 1940) is a retired United States Navy four-star admiral who served as Commander in Chief, United States Naval Forces Europe/Commander in Chief, Allied Forces Southern Europe from 1996 to 1998.

Awards and decorations

References

1940 births
United States Navy personnel of the Vietnam War
Living people
People from Fayette County, West Virginia
Recipients of the Defense Distinguished Service Medal
Recipients of the Legion of Merit
Recipients of the Navy Distinguished Service Medal
United States Navy admirals

External Links
The West Virginia & Regional History Center at West Virginia University, houses the Admiral Thomas J. Lopez papers within their Distinguished West Virginians Archive